The 2019 Tour of Romania was a five-day cycling stage race that took place in Romania in September 2019. The race was the 52nd edition of the Tour of Romania. The tour was rated as a 2.1 event, as part of the 2019 UCI Europe Tour.

Route

Teams
Twenty teams were invited to start the race. These included fourteen UCI Continental teams and six national teams.

Stages

Stage 1
11 September 2019 — Cluj-Napoca to Sighișoara,

Stage 2
12 September 2019 — Brașov to Focșani,

Stage 3
13 September 2019 — Buzău to Târgoviște,

Stage 4
14 September 2019 — Ploiești to Piatra Arsă,

Stage 5
15 September 2019 — Bucharest to Bucharest,

Classification leadership table

Standings

General classification

Points classification

Mountains classification

Young rider classification

Best Romanian rider classification

Team classification

See also

 2019 in men's road cycling
 2019 in sports

References

External links

2019 UCI Europe Tour
2019 in Romanian sport
2019
Tour of Romania